The 2013 election to the Grand Council was held in the canton of Geneva, Switzerland, on 6 October 2013.  All 100 members of the Grand Council were elected for four-year terms.

Results

|-
! style="background-color:#E9E9E9;text-align:left;" colspan=2 |Party
! style="background-color:#E9E9E9;text-align:left;" width=150px |Ideology
! style="background-color:#E9E9E9;text-align:right;" width=50px |Vote %
! style="background-color:#E9E9E9;text-align:right;" width=50px |Vote % ±
! style="background-color:#E9E9E9;text-align:right;" width=50px |Seats
! style="background-color:#E9E9E9;text-align:right;" width=50px |Seats ±
|-
| style="background-color: " |
| style="text-align:left;" | FDP.The Liberals
| style="text-align:left;" | Classical liberalism
| style="text-align:right;" | 22.37
| style="text-align:right;" | -3.93
| style="text-align:right;" | 24
| style="text-align:right;" | –71
|-
| style="background-color: " |
| style="text-align:left;" | Geneva Citizens' Movement
| style="text-align:left;" | Right-wing populism
| style="text-align:right;" | 19.23
| style="text-align:right;" | +4.49
| style="text-align:right;" | 20
| style="text-align:right;" | +3
|-
| style="background-color: " |
| style="text-align:left;" | Social Democratic Party
| style="text-align:left;" | Democratic socialism
| style="text-align:right;" | 14.33
| style="text-align:right;" | +1.42
| style="text-align:right;" | 15
| style="text-align:right;" | ±0
|-
| style="background-color: " |
| style="text-align:left;" | Christian Democratic People's Party
| style="text-align:left;" | Christian democracy
| style="text-align:right;" | 10.61
| style="text-align:right;" | +0.69
| style="text-align:right;" | 11
| style="text-align:right;" | ±0
|-
| style="background-color: " |
| style="text-align:left;" | Swiss People's Party
| style="text-align:left;" | National conservatism
| style="text-align:right;" | 10.33
| style="text-align:right;" | +1.77
| style="text-align:right;" | 11
| style="text-align:right;" | +2
|-
| style="background-color: " |
| style="text-align:left;" | Green Party
| style="text-align:left;" | Green politics
| style="text-align:right;" | 9.16
| style="text-align:right;" | -6.18
| style="text-align:right;" | 10
| style="text-align:right;" | -7
|-
| style="background-color: " |
| style="text-align:left;" | Together Left2
| style="text-align:left;" | Communism
| style="text-align:right;" | 8.75
| style="text-align:right;" | -3.49
| style="text-align:right;" | 9
| style="text-align:right;" | +9
|-
| style="background-color: " |
| style="text-align:left;" | Green Liberal Party
| style="text-align:left;" | Green liberalism
| style="text-align:right;" | 3.06
| style="text-align:right;" | +3.06
| style="text-align:right;" | 0
| style="text-align:right;" | ±0
|-
| style="background-color: " |
| style="text-align:left;" | Pirate Party
| style="text-align:left;" | Pirate politics
| style="text-align:right;" | 1.61
| style="text-align:right;" | +1.61
| style="text-align:right;" | 0
| style="text-align:right;" | ±0
|-
| style="background-color: " |
| style="text-align:left;" | Conservative Democratic Party
| style="text-align:left;" | Conservative liberalism
| style="text-align:right;" | 0.56
| style="text-align:right;" | +0.56
| style="text-align:right;" | 0
| style="text-align:right;" | ±0
|- style="background: #E9E9E9"
! style="text-align:left;" colspan=3| Total
| style="text-align:right;" |  100.00
| style="text-align:right;" | –
| 100
| style="text-align:right;" | –
|- style="background: #E9E9E9"
! style="text-align:left;" colspan=3| Turnout
| style="text-align:right;" |  41.05
| style="text-align:right;" |  1.39 
|  –
| style="text-align:right;" | –
|-

| colspan=9 style="text-align:left;" | 1 The Liberal Party of Geneva merged with the Free Democratic Party into FDP.The Liberals in 2011. The total of both parties' seats are used for this calculation.2 Alliance of SolidaritéS, Swiss Party of Labour, left-wing independents, Defence of the Elderly, Tenants of Housing and Social (DAL), Alternative Left,the Communist Party of Geneva, and Action of Citizens and Workers in Struggle (ACTE) 
|-
| colspan=9 style="text-align:left;" | Source: Republic and Canton of Geneva
|}

References

Geneva
Grand Council of Geneva elections